Carl Franz Anton Ritter von Schreibers (15 August 1775 – 21 May 1852) was an Austrian naturalist who was a native of Pressburg, Hungary, Habsburg Empire (today Bratislava, Slovakia).

In 1847, an uncommon iron-nickel-phosphide ((Fe,Ni)3P) mineral was named in his honor by Wilhelm Karl Ritter von Haidinger (1775–1871). The mineral is found in meteorites, and is known today as schreibersite. As a zoologist, he was the first to perform a comprehensive anatomical study of the olm, a cave-dwelling, aquatic amphibian. The plant genus Schreibersia (synonym Augusta, family Rubiaceae) was named in his honor by Johann Baptist Emanuel Pohl.

Biography
He earned his medical doctorate from Vienna in 1798, but also studied botany, mineralogy and zoology at the university. For a brief period of time he assisted his uncle, Joseph Ludwig von Schreibers, with his medical practice in Vienna. As a young man, he also toured museums throughout Europe. In 1802 he was an assistant of natural history and agricultural sciences at the University of Vienna. In 1806 he was appointed director of the Viennese natural history collections (Naturalienkabinette), which became his life's work.

Schreibers was involved with all aspects of natural sciences, and he embarked upon total organizational overhaul of the museum's natural history collections. During his time as director, the size of the museum's library grew from a few scientific books to a collection of over 30,000 volumes. Here, he stored the results of his personal research work, as well as a collection of meteorites — Schreibers' main interest of study. On 31 October 1848 some parts of the collections of the museum were destroyed by fire during the course of bombardment of Viennese revolutionaries by the Austrian Imperial Army. Schreibers was devastated by the loss, and retired soon afterwards. Fortunately his collection of meteorites was saved from destruction.

Schreibers is commemorated in the scientific names of two species of New World lizards: Cercosaura schreibersii and Leiocephalus schreibersii.

References

External links
 A biography Naturhistorisches Museum (Vienna)

Austrian naturalists
Austrian mineralogists
19th-century Austrian zoologists
19th-century Austrian botanists
Austrian knights
Hungarian nobility
Hungarian-German people
Austrian people of Hungarian descent
Scientists from Bratislava
1775 births
1852 deaths
Members of the Bavarian Academy of Sciences